Jhonatan Manuel Narváez Prado (born 4 March 1997) is an Ecuadorian professional road racing cyclist, who currently rides for UCI WorldTeam .

Career

Originally from El Playón de San Francisco in Ecuador's Sucumbíos Canton, whilst at school Narváez was a member of a cycling club founded by one of his teachers, former Olympic racing cyclist Juan Carlos Rosero. The club has also produced a number of other professional riders, including Richard Carapaz and Jonathan Caicedo. Narváez became a multiple-time Pan American Junior champion in 2015.

Narváez started the 2017 season competing in the Volta ao Alentejo. He won the Circuit des Ardennes with two stage runner-up finishes, despite a fall in the final stage.  He was the youngest winner of the event in a decade.

In 2018, Narváez joined UCI WorldTeam  on a three-year contract, making him one of only two Ecuadorians in the World Tour.

In May 2019, he was named in the startlist for the 2019 Giro d'Italia. He finished the race in 80th place. The following year he would once again compete in the Giro and while he did not finish the race, he did win a stage; stage 12, which was an intermediate/hilly stage. Narváez finished just over a minute ahead of Mark Padun and nearly seven minutes ahead of 3rd place Simon Clarke.

Major results

2014
 2nd Road race, Pan American Junior Road Championships
2015
 Pan American Junior Road Championships
2nd  Road race
3rd  Time trial
 Pan American Junior Track Championships
1st  Individual pursuit
1st  Points race
2016
 1st  Time trial, National Under–23 Road Championships
 2nd  Time trial, Pan American Under–23 Road Championships
 5th Overall Tour de Savoie Mont Blanc
1st  Mountains classification
2017
 1st  Road race, National Road Championships
 1st  Overall Circuit des Ardennes
1st  Young rider classification
 1st  Young rider classification, Colorado Classic
 6th Overall Tour of the Gila
1st  Young rider classification
1st Stage 5
2018
 1st Stage 1 (TTT) Adriatica Ionica Race
 2nd Road race, National Road Championships
 2nd La Drôme Classic
 5th Overall Tour de Wallonie
 6th Classic Sud-Ardèche
 7th Dwars door West–Vlaanderen
 10th Overall Colombia Oro y Paz
2020
 1st  Overall Settimana Internazionale di Coppi e Bartali
1st  Points classification
1st  Young rider classification
1st Stage 3
 1st Stage 12 Giro d'Italia
 8th Overall Tour de Wallonie
1st  Young rider classification
 10th Gran Trittico Lombardo
2021
 9th Nokere Koerse
2022
 4th BEMER Cyclassics
 6th Strade Bianche
 6th E3 Saxo Bank Classic

Grand Tour general classification results timeline

References

External links

1997 births
Living people
Ecuadorian male cyclists
Ecuadorian Giro d'Italia stage winners
People from Sucumbíos Province
Cyclists at the 2014 Summer Youth Olympics
Pan American Games competitors for Ecuador
Cyclists at the 2019 Pan American Games
Olympic cyclists of Ecuador
Cyclists at the 2020 Summer Olympics
21st-century Ecuadorian people